"Monothalamea" is a grouping of foraminiferans, traditionally consisting of all foraminifera with single-chambered tests. Recent work has shown that the grouping is paraphyletic, and as such does not constitute a natural group; nonetheless, the name "monothalamea" continues to be used by foraminifera workers out of convenience.

Classification 
"Monothalamea" traditionally contains two groups, neither of which is currently considered to be monophyletic:

 "Allogromiida" traditionally consists of all foraminifera which lack a mineralised test, instead having a test of tectin. Recent work has shown that this grouping is paraphyletic.
 "Astrorhizida" traditionally consists of all foraminifera with single-chambered, agglutinated tests. Recent work has shown that this grouping is polyphyletic, as agglutinated tests have evolved from proteinaceous tests multiple times throughout foraminiferal evolution.

Recent molecular evidence has revealed that the deep-sea xenophyophores are in fact agglutinated, single-chambered foraminifera. Molecular evidence has also revealed that the freshwater protist Reticulomyxa is in fact a naked, testless foraminifera, and as such it has been included with "monothalameans" in scientific discussion.

A 2013 molecular study  using small subunit rDNA concluded that known "monothalameans" made up at least 22 distinct living clades from marine environments with an additional four clades from freshwater eDNA.

References

Further reading 

Gubbay, S., Baker, M., Bettn, B., Konnecker, G. (2002). "The offshore directory: Review of a selection of habitats, communities and species of the north-east Atlantic", pp. 74–77. 
NOAA Ocean Explorer. "Windows to the deep exploration: Giants of the protozoa", p. 2.

External links 
Microscopy-UK: Note on Xenophyophores
More xenophyophore photos, with a map of their habitat

 
Foraminifera classes
Extremophiles
Taxa named by Ernst Haeckel